Ada Osakwe is a Nigerian economist, an entrepreneur and corporate executive, who is the founder and chief executive officer of Agrolay Ventures, an agribusiness investment company based in Nigeria, which invests in African agricultural food-related companies. From November 2012 until May 2015, Ada Osakwe was the Senior Investment Adviser to Nigeria's Minister of Agriculture and Rural Development, Akinwumi Adesina.

Background and education
Ada Osakwe was born in Nigeria on 2 September 1981. She attended secondary school in Lagos for her A-Level education, and graduated from the University of Hull, in the United Kingdom, with a Bachelor of Science in Economics. Her Master of Science in Economics and Finance was obtained from the University of Warwick, also in the UK. She also holds a Master of Business Administration, obtained from the Kellogg School of Management, at Northwestern University, in Evanston, Illinois in the United States.

Career
Ada Osakwe first worked as an investment banker with BNP Paribas at their London office. She then worked as a Senior Investment Officer at the African Development Bank (AfDB), mainly in the area of infrastructure finance, serving in that capacity for four years. Ada Osakwe was based in Tunis. Later, she served as vice-president at Kuramo Capital Management, a private equity company based in New York City.

After her work with the Nigerian Ministry of Agriculture, Ada Osakwe founded Agrolay Ventures. She also founded Nuli Juice, a restaurant chain in Nigeria. In 2017, she was appointed to the board of One Acre Fund, a Kenya-based financial and educational non-government organisation that serves small-scale farmers in Burundi, Kenya, Malawi, Rwanda, Tanzania and Uganda.

Awards
In December 2014, Ada Osakwe was named among the "Twenty Youngest Power Women in Africa 2014", by Forbes Magazine.

In March 2021, Ada Osakwe was awarded Business Woman Award by Forbes Magazine.

Ada Osakwe was named one of the "15 African Female Founders You Should Know in 2023" by African Folder in March 2023.

See also
Agriculture in Nigeria
Amira Elmissiry
Adiat Disu
Amy Jadesimi

Other activities
The entrepreneur who feels Nigeria has left small business to navigate COVID-19 alone.

Ada Osakwe becomes first African to give a speech at the convocation ceremony of Kellogg School of Management.

References

External links
 Website of Agrolay Ventures

1981 births
Living people
Nigerian economists
Nigerian businesspeople
Alumni of the University of Hull
Alumni of the University of Warwick
Northwestern University alumni
Kellogg School of Management alumni
Businesspeople from Lagos
Nigerian women in business
Nigerian women business executives
Nigerian chief executives
Nigerian food company founders
Nigerian expatriates in the United Kingdom
Nigerian expatriates in the United States